Michael Innerkofler (30 Juli 1844 – 20 August 1888) was a South Tyrol farmer, mountain climbing pioneer and mountain guide. He was born in Sexten. Innerkofler was a climbing pioneer of the Dolomites, and known for several first ascents. His first ascents include Zwölferkofel, Cima Ovest (in 1879) and Cima Piccola (in 1881) of the Tre Cime di Lavaredo, and various peaks/routes of Monte Cristallo.

Innerkofler perished in a crevasse accident on the mountain of Cristallo on 20 August 1888.

References

1844 births
1888 deaths
People from Sexten
Italian mountain climbers
Alpine guides
Accidental deaths in Italy
Mountaineering deaths